Pramila Gudanda Aiyappa (née Ganapathy) (born 8 March 1977 in Kodagu, Karnataka) is an Indian heptathlete. She made her official debut for the 2000 Summer Olympics in Sydney, where she placed 24th in the women's heptathlon event, with a total score of 5,548 points.

At the 2008 Summer Olympics in Beijing, Aiyappa made a comeback from her eight-year absence to compete for the second time in women's heptathlon, along with fellow athletes Shobha Javur and Susmita Singha Roy. She initially placed 28th out of 43 heptathletes in the event, with a total score of 5,771 points, but was elevated to a single higher position, when Ukraine's Lyudmila Blonska was stripped of her silver medal after testing positive for methyltestosterone.

Aiyappa represented the host nation India at the 2010 Commonwealth Games in Delhi, where she almost missed out of medal contention in the heptathlon, finishing only in fifth place, with a total score of 5,330 points.

She has been actively coaching upcoming athletes, along with her husband Sri Aiyappa.

References

External links

NBC 2008 Olympics profile

Indian heptathletes
Living people
Olympic athletes of India
Athletes (track and field) at the 2000 Summer Olympics
Athletes (track and field) at the 2008 Summer Olympics
Athletes (track and field) at the 2010 Commonwealth Games
Commonwealth Games competitors for India
Athletes from Karnataka
1977 births
Athletes (track and field) at the 2010 Asian Games
Asian Games medalists in athletics (track and field)
Kodava people
People from Kodagu district
Asian Games bronze medalists for India
Medalists at the 2010 Asian Games